Julius William Contz (born May 12, 1961) is a former American football offensive tackle who played six seasons in the National Football League (NFL) with the Cleveland Browns and New Orleans Saints. He was drafted by the Browns in the fifth round of the 1983 NFL Draft. He played college football at Pennsylvania State University and was a starter on the school's first ever national championship team in 1982. He attended Belle Vernon Area High School in Belle Vernon, Pennsylvania.

Contz's book "When the Lions Roared: Joe Paterno and One of College Football's Greatest Teams" (Triumph Books) was released in September 2017.

References

External links
Just Sports Stats

Living people
1961 births
Players of American football from Pennsylvania
American football offensive tackles
Penn State Nittany Lions football players
Cleveland Browns players
New Orleans Saints players
People from Fayette County, Pennsylvania